Igor Bjelan (born 9 August 1992) is a Serbian male badminton player. In 2015, he competed at the European Games in Baku, Azerbaijan. He won the Serbian National Badminton Championships in the men's singles event in 2008, 2010–2011, 2014; men's doubles event in 2010–2011, 2013, 2015; and mixed doubles event in 2010. He also represented his country at the Balkan Championships, and won the bronze medal in the mixed team event.

References

External links
 

1992 births
Living people
Sportspeople from Knin
Serbian male badminton players
European Games competitors for Serbia
Badminton players at the 2015 European Games
Serbs of Croatia